Albegov (masculine) or Albegova (feminine) is a Russian surname. Notable people with the surname include:

Ruslan Albegov (born 1988), Russian weightlifter
Soslan Albegov (born 1997), Russian footballer

Russian-language surnames